The 1997 Montreal Expos season was the 29th season of the franchise. They finished 78-84, 23 games back of the Atlanta Braves in the NL East and 14 games back of the Florida Marlins in the Wild Card. They played the Toronto Blue Jays in Interleague play for the first time during the season.

Offseason
 October 28, 1996: John Habyan was released by the Montreal Expos.
November 15, 1996: Dave Silvestri was selected off waivers by the Seattle Mariners from the Montreal Expos.
December 17, 1996: Torey Lovullo was signed as a free agent with the Montreal Expos.
January 21, 1997: Lee Smith signed as a free agent with the Montreal Expos.
January 28, 1997: Yamil Benitez was traded by the Montreal Expos to the Kansas City Royals for Melvin Bunch.
 March 26, 1997: Cliff Floyd was traded by the Montreal Expos to the Florida Marlins for Dustin Hermanson and Joe Orsulak.
March 31, 1997: Rico Rossy was signed as a free agent with the Montreal Expos.

Spring training
The Expos held spring training at West Palm Beach Municipal Stadium in West Palm Beach, Florida – a facility they shared with the Atlanta Braves – for the last time in 1997. It was their 21st season at the stadium; they had conducted spring training there from 1969 to 1972 and since 1981. In the final spring training game at Municipal Stadium, held on March 26, 1997, the Expos defeated the Braves 2-0. The following season, the Expos moved their spring training activities to Roger Dean Stadium in Jupiter, Florida.

Regular season
In 1997, Pedro Martínez posted a 17-8 record for the Expos, and led the league in half a dozen pitching categories, including a 1.90 ERA, 305 strikeouts and 13 complete games pitched, and won the National League Cy Young Award. Pedro Martínez was also the first right-handed pitcher to reach 300 strikeouts with an ERA under 2.00 since Walter Johnson in 1912.

The 13 complete games were tied for the second-highest single-season total in all of baseball since Martínez's career began (Curt Schilling had 15 in 1998; Chuck Finley and Jack McDowell also reached 13 in a year). However, this 1997 total is by far the highest in Martínez's career, as he has only completed more than 5 games in one other season (7, in 2000).

May 7, 1997 – The Expos set a team record (never broken) in runs scored in one inning as they score 13 runs off of Julián Tavárez, Jim Poole, and Joe Roa of the San Francisco Giants at 3Com Park. The Expos would go on to defeat the Giants 19 to 3. The only non-pitcher on the Expos to not register a hit was Sherman Obando who went 0 for 1. An up-and-coming prospect named Vladimir Guerrero hit his first career double and was struck by his second career pitch. A crowd of 9,958 were on hand to witness it in San Francisco.

Opening Day starters
 Shane Andrews
 Jim Bullinger
 Darrin Fletcher
 Mark Grudzielanek
 Mike Lansing
 Joe Orsulak
 Henry Rodríguez
 David Segui
 Rondell White

Season standings

Record vs. opponents

Notable transactions
May 20, 1997: Torey Lovullo was released by the Montreal Expos.
July 25, 1997: Omar Daal was selected off waivers by the Toronto Blue Jays from the Montreal Expos.
July 31, 1997: Jeff Juden was traded by the Montreal Expos to the Cleveland Indians for Steve Kline.
September 25, 1997: Lee Smith was released by the Montreal Expos.

Roster

Interleague Play
June 30 – The first interleague game between the Montreal Expos and the Toronto Blue Jays took place at SkyDome. The Expos won the game by a score of 2-1.

Expos vs. Jays
June 30, SkyDome, Toronto, Ontario

Batting

Pitching

Player stats

Batting

Starters by position
Note: Pos = Position; G = Games played; AB = At bats; H = Hits; Avg. = Batting average; HR = Home runs; RBI = Runs batted in

Other batters
Note: G = Games played; AB = At bats; H = Hits; Avg. = Batting average; HR = Home runs; RBI = Runs batted inPitching

Starting pitchersNote: G = Games pitched; IP = Innings pitched; W = Wins; L = Losses; ERA = Earned run average; SO = StrikeoutsOther pitchersNote: G = Games pitched; IP = Innings pitched; W = Wins; L = Losses; ERA = Earned run average; SO = StrikeoutsRelief pitchersNote: G = Games pitched; W = Wins; L = Losses; SV = Saves; ERA = Earned run average; SO = Strikeouts 

Award winners
 Pedro Martínez, NL Cy Young Award
 Pedro Martínez, Pitcher of the Month, August
	
1997 Major League Baseball All-Star Game
 Pedro Martínez, pitcher, reserve

Farm system

LEAGUE CHAMPIONS: Harrisburg

References

External links
 1997 Montreal Expos team at Baseball-Reference''
 1997 Montreal Expos team at baseball-almanac.com

Montreal Expos seasons
Montreal Expos Season, 1997
1990s in Montreal
1997 in Quebec